Mite Cikarski (Macedonian: Мите Цикарски; born 6 January 1993) is a Macedonian professional footballer who plays as a defender.

Club career
Born in Strumica, Mite Cikarski was playing in Serbia with FK Partizan youth team, when in summer 2011, he was brought to FK Vardar to play in the Macedonian First League. In January 2018, he transferred to PAS Giannina. On February 26, 2019 he released on a free transfer from PAS Giannina.

International career
He has been a member of Macedonian U-19 and U-21 national teams and made his senior debut for North Macedonia in a December 2012 friendly match against Poland and has, as of March 2020, earned a total of 3 caps, scoring no goals.

Honours
Vardar
Macedonian First Football League: 2011–12, 2012–13
Rabotnički
Macedonian Football Cup: 2014–15

Career statistics

Club

References

External links
 

1993 births
Living people
Sportspeople from Strumica
Macedonian footballers
North Macedonia youth international footballers
North Macedonia under-21 international footballers
North Macedonia international footballers
Association football fullbacks
FK Vardar players
FK Rabotnički players
Ethnikos Achna FC players
PAS Giannina F.C. players
CS Gaz Metan Mediaș players
Akademija Pandev players
Botev Plovdiv players
Macedonian First Football League players
Cypriot First Division players
Super League Greece players
Liga I players
First Professional Football League (Bulgaria) players
Macedonian expatriate footballers
Macedonian expatriate sportspeople in Serbia
Expatriate footballers in Serbia
Macedonian expatriate sportspeople in Cyprus
Expatriate footballers in Cyprus
Macedonian expatriate sportspeople in Greece
Expatriate footballers in Greece
Macedonian expatriate sportspeople in Romania
Expatriate footballers in Romania
Macedonian expatriate sportspeople in Bulgaria
Expatriate footballers in Bulgaria